Sagarchin is a border crossing point between Kazakhstan and Russia. It is located in the Akbulaksky District, Orenburg Oblast, Russia.

The functioning of the border crossing is affected by the actions of the Kazakhstan Customs, Kazakhstan Border Control and some other Kazakhstan bureaus in Zhaisan.

Distances from Sagarchin

Orenburg: 154 km
Aktobe: 131 km

External links

Kazakhstan–Russia border crossings

Rural localities in Orenburg Oblast